The National Intercollegiate Women's Fencing Association (NIWFA) is a women's collegiate fencing organization in the United States. The organization was founded as the IWFA in 1929 by two New York University students, Julia Jones and Dorothy Hafner, and Betsy Ross, a student at Cornell University who based the organization on the male Intercollegiate Fencing Association. The IWFA became the "National Intercollegiate Women's Fencing Association" in 1964 and called for a national championship, which it  conducted annually among its membership.  From 1980 through 1982, a national championship was also administered by the Association for Intercollegiate Athletics for Women.

Programs 

Bryn Mawr College
City College of New York
Drew University
Fairleigh Dickinson University
University of Florida
Haverford College
Hunter College
Lafayette College
University of Maryland
Mount Holyoke College
Queens College, City University of New York
Rutgers University
Smith College
Stevens Institute of Technology
Swarthmore College
Temple University
University of Virginia
Yeshiva University
United States Military Academy
United States Naval Academy

See also
United States Association of Collegiate Fencing Clubs (USACFC)
Intercollegiate Fencing Association

References

 
Fencing organizations
Women's sports organizations in the United States